The 2006–07 A1 Grand Prix of Nations, Netherlands was an A1 Grand Prix race, held on October 1, 2006 at the Circuit Park Zandvoort circuit in Zandvoort, Netherlands. This was the first race in the 2006-07 A1 Grand Prix season.

Report

Practice

Qualifying

Qualification took place on Saturday, September 30, 2006

After a technical oversight, the fastest time for A1 Team Switzerland was disallowed, adjusting their starting position from 5th to 11th.

Sprint race

Main race

Results

Sprint Race Results
The Sprint Race took place on Sunday, October 1, 2006

 Zaugg was awarded extra point for fastest lap out of the two races.

Feature race grid

New for the 2006/07 season is the way to determine the feature race order. The grid is determined on three factors:

 The driver’s grid position for the Sprint race. 
 The driver’s final position in the Sprint race. 
 The fastest lap time in the Sprint race.

Points are awarded for each element. If a driver started the Sprint race on pole, he would be awarded one point, if he started the race second he would get two points, right down to the 23rd on the grid who will get 23 points.

The same occurs for the race positions – the winner gets one point, the runner-up two and third three points, right down to the last finisher who scores 23. Similarly for the fastest laps; the fastest gets one point, the second two and so on.

The points are all added together after the end of the sprint race; the driver with the lowest number of points will start the Feature race on pole.

If two teams finish on the same number of points after the calculations, the driver who achieved a higher finish position in the Sprint race will be awarded the better starting position.

Main Race Results
The Main Race took place also on Sunday, October 1, 2006.

Total Points
Total points awarded:

 Fastest Lap: Adrian Zaugg, A1 Team South Africa, 1'29.125 (186.9 km/h) on lap 7 of Sprint Race

References
http://www.a1gp.com/news/index.php?flashNavId=1&newsid=391 
http://www.a1gp.com/news/index.php?flashNavId=1&newsid=388

A1 Grand Prix of Nations, Netherlands
Netherlands